Daniel Fells (born September 23, 1983) is a former American football tight end. He played college football at UC Davis and was signed by the Atlanta Falcons as an undrafted free agent in 2006.

Fells was also a member of the St. Louis Rams, Denver Broncos and New England Patriots.

Early years
Fells attended Fullerton Union High School. He was an All-Freeway League performer in football, basketball and baseball and was named All-CIF honors in football and was named team most valuable player. Fells was also All-SoCalHoops D-IIA honorable mention as a senior in basketball. His brother is Darren Fells, who plays tight end for the Detroit Lions.

College career
Fells attended University of California, Davis and joined the team as a wide receiver.  Following a position change orchestrated by the coaching staff, Fells made the transition to play tight end and as a senior was a Second-team All-Great West Football Conference (GWFC) selection with 10 receptions for 165 yards and one touchdown. In 2004, as a junior, he was a First-team All-GWFC, with 35 receptions for 520 yards and one touchdown. As a member of the UC Davis Aggies in 2003, he won team's award as outstanding sophomore. In 2002, he was on the roster but did not play, and he redshirted in 2001.

Professional career

Atlanta Falcons
Fells was originally signed by the Atlanta Falcons as an undrafted free agent in 2006.

St. Louis Rams
In October 2008, Fells signed a free agent contract with the St. Louis Rams. In 2008, he played 12 games with one start and caught seven passes for 81 yards. He was placed on injured reserve on December 21, 2008. In 2009, he came back with 21 catches for 273 yards and three touchdowns. He played in 14 games and started four. Then in 2010, he played in every game and started in seven. He had career high in catches, and receiving yards with rookie Sam Bradford.

Denver Broncos
Fells signed a one-year contract with the Denver Broncos on July 31, 2011.

New England Patriots
Fells agreed to sign a three-year deal with the New England Patriots on March 19, 2012. On August 30, 2013 Fells was released.

New York Giants
On January 7, 2014, Fells was signed by the New York Giants. On October 5, 2015, the Giants announced that Fells had been dealing with a chronic ankle condition, which was later discovered to be a staphylococcal infection, a discovery made after he had received a cortisone injection for his ankle injury. The infection was found to be methicillin-resistant Staphylococcus aureus (MRSA), which is resistant to many antibiotics that are used to treat staph infections. Fells had a high fever upon his arrival on October 2, 2015, at the emergency room, where he had been taken by his wife. Due to the staph infection found in his ankle, he was placed on injured reserve. On October 9, 2015, he was moved from the intensive care unit (ICU) to a private room. On July 26, 2016, Fells announced his retirement from the NFL.

References

External links
UC Davis Aggies bio 

1983 births
Living people
Players of American football from Anaheim, California
American football tight ends
American football fullbacks
UC Davis Aggies football players
Atlanta Falcons players
Oakland Raiders players
Tampa Bay Buccaneers players
St. Louis Rams players
Denver Broncos players
New England Patriots players
New York Giants players
Ed Block Courage Award recipients